The Tianjin Metro or Tianjin Rail Transit is the rapid transit system in the city of Tianjin, which was the second city in mainland China after Beijing to operate a subway system (the Beijing Subway opened in 1971). Opened in 1984, the system has 8 operating lines and 205 stations spanning .

The lines are jointly operated by two companies: the Tianjin Metro Group Co. Ltd and the Binhai Mass Transit Development Co. Ltd. The former operates Lines 1, 2, 3, 6, and 10, while the latter operates Lines 5 and 9. The two companies merged and regrouped as the Tianjin Rail Transit Group Co. (TRT) in 2017.

History
Tianjin, as an inland harbor of China, has long been a major commercial city. After the founding of the People's Republic in 1949, the number of vehicles on the roads significantly increased, causing pollution. To overcome these problems, the transport authority decided to close the old tram network and switch over to a rapid transit system.

However, due to cost, it was not until 1970 that construction of the system first took place. The first section, spanning  of track and 4 stations (Xinhualu, Yingkoudao, Anshandao and Haiguangsi), was completed by February 1976. Further construction was delayed due to an earthquake in 1976. The second section, with an additional  of track and the Xinanjiao and Erweilu stations, was completed by 1980.

To reduce construction costs, the transport authority decided to use an abandoned canal bed to form part of the system, and did not dig deeply. By using the canal bed, the underground section is only 2–3 meters under the street surface, and was the world's shallowest metro. There were only 1,000 full-time construction workers at that time; the others were volunteers from factories, schools and institutions all over the city. The average number of volunteer workers exceeded 2,000 a day, which rendered the project unique in the world then. Construction was delayed in 1976 when an earthquake hit the city, but was resumed in 1979 and completed by 1984.

At the end of the 1990s, it was observed that the Metro system was quite out of date. The atmosphere of the stations was uninviting, difficult to navigate, and with few passenger amenities on the platforms. Trains were infrequent, sporadic and commonly delayed. The trains themselves were dilapidated, seat covers often torn off, and dim. Taking into consideration more modern, cleaner systems in East Asia, a massive reconstruction, modernization and expansion plan was laid out in 2000. In preparation, the system was closed on 1 September 2001, with renovation starting on 21 November. After purchasing new rolling stock, adding half-height platform screen doors and extending the line up to Shuanglin, the line re-opened on 6 December 2006 as Line 1, after trial testing that began on 12 June of that year.

During the renovation of the first line, other lines underwent construction. Line 9, operated by Binhai Mass Transit Development Co. Ltd, began construction in 2001 and its first section opened on 28 March 2004. Between 2004 and 2007, many new stations on the line opened successively. The Tram line in the system, the TEDA Modern Guided Rail Tram, was built to serve the Tianjin Economic Development Area and was opened on 10 May 2007. Line 2, after a lengthy construction delay and a structural accident, finally opened, as two separate sections, to the public on 1 July 2012, with the sections being reconnected on 28 August 2013. Line 3, another main north-south line, opened in October 2012.

Lines

Line 1

Line 1 is built upon the old surface-level line, and was opened in 2006. The old at-grade Shuanglin station was closed on 28 December 2016 and reopened as a new underground station on 3 December 2018. The old rolling stocks (DKZ9 Series) were replaced at the same time. Line 1's color is red.

Line 2

Line 2 opened for trial operations on 1 July 2012. Due to a structural accident in Jianguodao Station, Line 2 was operated as two separate sections from July 2012 to 28 August 2013, when the affected station opened after being rebuilt. Line 2's color is yellow.

Line 3

Line 3, running southeast-northwest, opened on 1 October 2012. Of the 21 stations, one is elevated, one is at ground level and the other 19 are underground. Line 3's color is light blue.

Line 4

The southern section of Line 4 is opened in December 2021 from Dongnanjiao to Xinxingcun. Line 4's color is green.

Line 5

Line 5 runs from Beichenkejiyuanbei to Liqizhuangnan with 28 stations. On 22 October 2018, the section from Danhebeidao to Zhongyiyifuyuan (26 stations) became operational. On 31 January 2019, the line was extended one station to Beichenkejiyuanbei. On 7 December 2021, the line was extended one station to Liqizhuangnan. Line 5 and Line 6 forms a loop. It is run by Tianjin Binhai Mass Transit Development Co., Ltd, which becomes a subsidiary of Tianjin Rail Transit Group Corporation since 2017. Line 5's color is orange.

Line 6

The section from Changhonggongyuan to Nancuiping opened on 6 August 2016. The section from Nansunzhuang to Changhonggongyuan opened on 31 December 2016. The section from Nancuiping to Meilinlu opened on 26 April 2018, and the section from Meilinlu to Lushuidao opened on 28 December 2021. Line 6's color is magenta.

Line 8 

This line is also the first metro line in Tianjin to use Type A, GoA4 automated trains. Line 8's color is violet.

Line 9 

Line 9 is an east-west line running just north of the Haihe River. It runs from Tianjin railway station to Donghai Road station. It was opened in 2004, spanning  with 21 stations.  The line provides interchange to the TEDA Tram line. Line 9 was suspended after damage from the August 2015 explosions, and resumed operation on 16 December from Tianjin Railway Station to Tianjin Pipe Corporation Station. Now, the damaged part has been reopened, along with two new stations: Zhangguizhuang and Taihulu. The line is operated by Tianjin Binhai Mass Transit Development Co., Ltd, which becomes a subsidiary of Tianjin Rail Transit Group Corporation since 2017. Line 9's color is blue.

Line 10 

It opened in 2022. Line 10's color is chartreuse.

TEDA Modern Guided Rail Tram 

The TEDA Tram is a tram line that runs between TEDA and North of College District stations, mainly serving the Tianjin Economic Development Area (TEDA). It is run by Tianjin Binhai Mass Transit Development Co., Ltd, which becomes a subsidiary of Tianjin Rail Transit Group Corporation since 2017. TEDA Line's color is light green.

Rolling stock
There were older, box-type metro cars, built by Nippon Sharyo until the system was closed for reconstruction. After re-opening, 114 CNR Changchun Railway Vehicle Company Limited Rapid Train set Vehicle cars entered service & replaced the old ones. Unlike the old cars, the CNR cars contain air conditioning.

Fares
Tianjin Metro uses magnetic smartcards. The fare is distance-based and ranges between 2 and 5 Yuan.

Journeys can be paid for using QR codes.

One-way ticket
One-way tickets are available at automatic ticket machines, where passengers can purchase up to 9 tickets. The tickets are only effective in three hours from purchase. You can purchase it from the automatic ticket machine, and recycle it by simply inserting it into the turnstile when you leave the station.

Common Stored Value Ticket
Stored-value tickets can be repeatedly used for the regular subway passengers, the fare for each journey outbound passengers through the gates when the balance deducted from the stored-value tickets. Within one year of non-use of stored-value tickets as expired, outdated stored-value tickets available at the station free update procedures for handling customer service center. Common Stored Value Ticket holders to enjoy 10% off travel.

Student discount tickets and tickets for the elderly
All full-time students attending schools, technical secondary, craftsmen, and vocational schools with student ID issued by letter may purchase student tickets and enjoy a student discount.

Seniors between 60 and 69 years old with a "Tianjin old preference card" (green) can buy discounted senior tickets, seniors 70 years old and older, with a "Tianjin old preference card" (purple) may purchase specially discounted tickets.

Half-price tickets, and by sub-votes
On 8 December 2006 (Tianjin Metro) Line 1 ordered to launch half-price tickets, a free second ticket and group ticket three kinds of tickets.

Half-price ticket card prepaid value of 200 yuan, the sale price of 100 yuan, 10 yuan deposit required to pay extra for a total purchase price of 110 per issue. So doing half-price ticket fare can be enjoyed nine discount and eventually converted into 4.5 fold. Half-price tickets from the purchase date (including day of) 90 days, the use of force within the validity period can not be recharged, the amount within 90 days after the ticket automatically cleared, tickets void. When it expires, the undamaged coupon presents their deposit slip and a detailed description to any customer service center station, with a refundable deposit of 10 Yuan.

By sub-votes is divided into two kinds: first, the amount of 35 yuan ticket can take 20 times, pay extra 10 yuan deposit for a total purchase price of 45. The second vote the amount of 80 can take 50 times, pay extra 10 yuan deposit for a total purchase price of 90. By sub-vote from the date of purchase, valid for 30 days after expiry, the card automatically cleared by Ci. If all the x-use within the validity period has finished, you can vote again to take within the Result purchase the corresponding times, since the Result date, the purchase by meeting the entry into force is still valid for 30 days. As of 2007 December 30, by sub-votes will not accept refill, take the time to use the remaining card after the ticket void.

City Card
The City Card is a non-contact type IC card Transit card similar to the Yikatong card in Beijing. It is accepted in subway, light rail, bus, ferry and taxi transport. Since 28 December 2006, City Card has been accepted on the Metro Line 1. City Card holders can enjoy a discounted fare during transfers between modes. This is the most popular method for long distance traveling. Ferryboat and bus fares are not distance based.

Unlimited ride

Future expansion
The "Tianjin Metro Phase 2 construction plan", which is approved by the NDRC, consists 513 km of lines total.

Lines under construction

Line 7
Line 7 started construction in 2019 and will run from Saidalu to Xifengdao. It is 26.53 km long with 21 stations and runs north south. The line will use six car Type A trains.

Line 11
Line 11 will run from Shuishanggongyuanxilu to Dongliliujinglu. It is 22.6 km long with 21 stations. Eastern part of the phase 1 of line 11, from Dongjiangdao to Dongliliujinglu (11 stations) is scheduled to open in late 2023.

Line B1 

Line Z2 
A western extension to Jinzhonghedajie station on Lines 5 and 6 is under planning.

Line Z4 

Gallery

Network Map

See also
 Transport in Tianjin
 List of rapid transit systems

References

External links
  Tianjin Rail Transit Official Site
  Official site (old)
 CNR Changchun Railway Vehicle Co., Ltd Rapid Trainset Vehicle(Invailable Page)
 Urbanrail.net
  Topics on Tianjin Metro
  Long term plan of the metro

 
Projects established in 1970
Rapid transit in China
Rail transport in Tianjin
Railway lines opened in 1984
Standard gauge railways in China